The Emerald Coast Classic is an 8 team college basketball tournament held during Thanksgiving of NCAA Division I men's basketball season, with the inaugural tournament beginning in 2014. The two final round games are played on the campus of Northwest Florida State College in Niceville, Florida. The tournament will be presented by Global Sports. First and second-round games are played at on-campus sites, with the third round and championship round scheduled Thanksgiving weekend at Northwest Florida State College.

Tournament History

Champions

Brackets 
* – Denotes overtime period

2022 
The tournament is set to take place from November 25 - 26, 2022.

First Round

Championship round

2021 
LSU, Oregon State, Penn State and Wake Forest headline the field for the 2021 Emerald Coast Classic.

First-round games played at on-campus sites. Second- and championship-round games played on the campus of Northwest Florida State College in Niceville, Florida.

First Round

Championship round

2019

Championship round

2018

First and Second Round 
First and second-round games were played at campus sites November 10–20, 2018 with the third round and championship round scheduled for Thanksgiving weekend, November 23 and 25.

Championship round

2017

First and Second Round 
First and second-round games were played at on-campus sites November 12–21, 2017 with the third round and championship round scheduled for Thanksgiving weekend, November 24 and 25.

Championship round

2016

First and Second Round 
First and second-round games were played at on-campus sites November 13–22, 2016 with the third round and championship round scheduled for Thanksgiving weekend, November 25 and 26.

Championship round

2015

First and Second Round

Championship round

2014

First and Second Round 
First and second-round games were played at on-campus sites November 20–25, 2014 with the third round and championship round scheduled for Thanksgiving weekend, November 28 and 29.

Championship round

References

External links
 Emerald Coast Classic

College basketball competitions
College men's basketball competitions in the United States
Recurring sporting events established in 2014
2014 establishments in Florida
Basketball competitions in Florida
Okaloosa County, Florida